Cochabamba (possibly from Quechua qucha lake, pampa a large plain) is an archaeological site of the Inca period in Peru. It is situated in the Amazonas Region, Chachapoyas Province, Chuquibamba District, near the village of Chuquibamba.

See also 
 Machu Pirqa
 Purum Llaqta

References 

Archaeological sites in Peru
Archaeological sites in Amazonas Region